Petar Stojanović (7 September 1877 – 11 September 1957) was a Serbian violinist and composer of operettas, ballets and orchestral music. (His birthday is also variously given as 6 September and 25 August.)

Life 
He was born in Budapest and studied the violin there with Jenő Hubay. At the Vienna Conservatory, he studied violin with Jakob Grün and composition with Robert Fuchs and Richard Heuberger. In 1925, he became professor of violin in Belgrade, where he lived until his death. A music college in the town of Ub is named after him.

Selected works
Stage
Tigar (The Tiger; Der Tiger), comic opera; libretto by R. von Perger, Budapest, 14 November 1905
Devojka na Mansardi (The Girl from the Garrett; Liebchen am Dach); libretto by Viktor Léon, 1917
Mirjana, ballet (1942)
Devet čiraka (Nine Candlesticks), ballet (1944)

Orchestral
Smrt junaka (The Hero's Death), symphonic poem (1918)
Sava, symphonic poem (1935)

Concertante
Violin Concerto No. 1 in D minor, op. 1 (1904)
Violin Concerto No. 2 (Prague, 1916)
Violin Concerto No. 3 
Violin Concerto No. 4
Violin Concerto No. 5 in D major, op. 78 (1944)
Double Concerto for Violin, Piano and orchestra in A major, op. 110 (1950)

Chamber music
 Piano Quintet in C minor, Op. 9 (published 1909)
 Piano Quartet in D major, Op. 15 (published 1913)
 Piano Trio, Op. 16 (published 1913)
 Jugoslovenski rondo i Humoreska  (Yugoslavian Rondo and Humoresque) for violin and piano (published 1955)
 Sonata in C major for viola and piano, Op. 97

External links

References

1877 births
1957 deaths
20th-century classical composers
Serbian composers
Serbian classical violinists
Male classical violinists
Serbian opera composers
Musicians from Budapest
University of Music and Performing Arts Vienna alumni
Male classical composers
20th-century Hungarian male musicians
Austro-Hungarian musicians
Yugoslav musicians